Eupatorium hyssopifolium, also known as hyssopleaf thoroughwort, is a fall-blooming herbaceous plant native to North America.  Like other members of the genus Eupatorium it has inflorescences containing a large number of very small flower heads, each with 5 white disc florets but no ray florets.  At 0.5 to one meter (20-40 inches) tall, it is towards the shorter end of the range of heights found in Eupatorium species.

Plants which are classified as E. hyssopifolium can be either diploid or polyploid, and some of them seem to have been the result of past hybridizations with Eupatorium serotinum.  Hybrids with E. album  and E. linearifolium also seem to exist.  The hybrid E. torreyanum is similar to E. hyssopifolium but is a hybrid of E. serotinum and Eupatorium mohrii.

Eupatorium hyssopifolium is found in much of the eastern and south-central United States, from Massachusetts west to Wisconsin, and as far south as Texas and Florida.  It grows in moist soils.

Varieties
Eupatorium hyssopifolium var. hyssopifolium - leaves 2–5 mm wide
Eupatorium hyssopifolium var. laciniatum A.Gray - leaves 5–15 mm wide

Uses 
Eupatorium hyssopifolium can be used medicinally (applied externally for insect and reptile bites).  It can also be planted near crops to attract beneficial insects.

References

External links 
 

hyssopifolium
Flora of the United States
Plants described in 1753
Taxa named by Carl Linnaeus